USCGC Harriet Lane (WMEC-903) is a United States Coast Guard medium endurance cutter. Named after Harriet Lane, niece and official hostess of President James Buchanan. Harriet Lane was constructed by Tacoma Boatbuilding, Tacoma, Washington and delivered 20 April 1984.

History
Harriet Lane was commissioned on 14 June 1984 and has served the Coast Guard and the nation with distinction, for example, by conducting Coast Guard and national defense missions from Maine to South America and even into the Pacific Northwest.  In 1994, as the Commander of Operation Able Manner forces, she directed the rescue of thousands of Haitian and Cuban migrants flowing across the Windward Passage and Florida Straits toward U.S. shores.  During this mass migration, Harriet Lane's crew saved over 2,400 migrants, directed 15 cutters, an aerostat and multiple aircraft.  She has twice been a key U.S. participant in the annual UNITAS multi-national exercise with South American navies in 1994 and 1997.  In 1995, Harriet Lane conducted a trial Alaska patrol to determine the feasibility of placing a WMEC in the Seventeenth District.   In 1996, Harriet Lane was the on scene commander for much of the initial search and recovery of TWA Flight 800 off Long Island.  She escorted an international fleet of tall ships during the OPSAIL 2000 Parade of Sail.  Most recently, exhibiting the Coast Guard's multi-mission nature and typical of Harriet Lane's twenty years of service, she stood as a maritime security sentry in Charleston, South Carolina Harbor for the Operation Iraqi Freedom load-out, then moved south to the Caribbean and seized two tons of cocaine headed for the U.S., and finally, rescued several hundred migrants attempting to reach the U.S. in unseaworthy boats.  Most recently in May 2010, Harriet Lane was directly involved in response efforts of the Deepwater Horizon offshore drilling rig in the Gulf of Mexico after the major explosion that sank the rig. This was considered the worst environmental disaster in US history.

Notable commanders
Paul F. Zukunft, Admiral, U.S. Coast Guard

See also
USRC Harriet Lane (1857) - Original cutter named Harriet Lane

External links
Harriet Lane home page
Deepwater Horizon Response

Ships of the United States Coast Guard
Famous-class cutters
Ships built by Tacoma Boatbuilding Company
1984 ships